Galore is a compilation album released by Kirsty MacColl in 1995. It features material previously released on the studio albums Desperate Character (1981), Kite (1989), Electric Landlady (1991) and Titanic Days (1993), among other tracks by MacColl, totalling eighteen songs. Some of the tracks differ from their original releases; a couple of songs, such as "Innocence", are alternate takes, while "Miss Otis Regrets" is a different edit that omits the second half, "Just One of Those Things", performed by the Pogues. On release the album peaked at No. 6, MacColl's highest ever charting album.

Track listing

Liner notes
The liner notes for the album include testimonials from MacColl's associates, including:

"Unpretentious, inimitable, writes like a playwright, sings like an angel." Billy Bragg

"When you hear these songs of Kirsty's, you're going to want to hang out with her too." Chris Frantz and Tina Weymouth

"One in a line of great English songwriters that includes Ray Davies, Paul Weller and Morrissey… the Noelle Coward of her generation!" Bono

"She has great songs and a crackin' bust." Morrissey

"Why isn't she massively successful? Kirsty's got the talent, the looks, the guts, the imagination, the passion, the hunger and whatever that magic thing is that makes her one of the great one-offs, and should be up where she belongs." Shane MacGowan

"The voice of an angel from a mind and heart inflamed by Thatcher's England." David Byrne

"Strange stories of people, relationships and life, with all the wit of Ray Davies and the harmonic invention of The Beach Boys. Only cooler." Johnny Marr

Reception
"Her songs are built from the stuff of real people's real lives, not the moonings of an imagination stalled on the tour bus," enthused Q's David Hepworth in a four-star review, "and they underline the fact that great pop music is still among us if we only know where to look."

Charts

References

External links
Galore at KirstyMacColl.com

1995 compilation albums
Kirsty MacColl albums
Albums produced by Steve Lillywhite
Virgin Records compilation albums